The Mercedes-Benz OM640 engine is a 2.0 liter inline-four cylinder  diesel engine manufactured by the Mercedes-Benz division of Daimler AG.

Other applications
The OM640 is the basis for the Thielert Centurion 2.0 aircraft engine. 

Also used as the basis for the Austro Engine AE-300/330 aircraft engine in Diamond DA-42 and DA-62 aircraft.

See also
 List of Mercedes-Benz engines

References

OM640
Diesel engines by model
Straight-four engines